The 2017 Summer Universiade, officially known as the XXIX Summer Universiade and commonly called Taipei 2017, was an international multi-sport event that took place in Taipei, Taiwan from 19 to 30 August 2017.

Bid selection

 
The cities of Brasília in Brazil and Taipei in Taiwan were in contention for the Games. Taipei was elected as the host city of the 2017 Summer Universiade by FISU on 29 November 2011, in Brussels, Belgium.

Venues
 Army Academy R.O.C. Gymnasium (Volleyball)
 Chang Gung University Stadium (Football)
 Chinese Culture University Gymnasium (Volleyball)
 Expo Dome (Billiards)
 Fu Jen Catholic University Stadium (Football)
 Hsinchu County Gymnasium (Judo, Wushu)
 Hsinchu County Natatorium (Water Polo)
 Hsinchu County Second Stadium (Football)
 Hsinchu Municipal Gymnasium (Basketball)
 National Taiwan Normal University Main Campus Gymnasium (Volleyball)
 National Taiwan Sport University Stadium (Archery, Swimming, Water Polo)
 National Taiwan University Sports Center (Volleyball)
 National Tsing Hua University Gymnasium (Volleyball)
 New Taipei City Breeze Canal (open water swimming)
 New Taipei City Xinzhuang Gymnasium 1F (Table Tennis)
 New Taipei City Xinzhuang Stadium (Football)
 Ren'ai Road, Taipei City (Roller Sports marathons)
 Sunrise Golf and Country Club (Golf)
 Taipei Arena (Basketball)
 Taipei Gymnasium (Badminton)
 Taipei Heping Basketball Gymnasium (Basketball)
 Taipei Municipal Stadium (Athletics, ceremonies)
 Taipei Nangang Exhibition Center (Fencing, Gymnastics)
 Taipei Songshan Sports Center (Water Polo)
 Taipei Tennis Center (Tennis)
 Tamkang University Shao-Mo Memorial Gymnasium 7F (Weightlifting)
 Taoyuan Arena (Taekwondo)
 Tianmu Baseball Stadium (Baseball)
 University of Taipei (Tianmu) Gymnasium (Basketball)
 University of Taipei (Tianmu) Shih-hsin Hall B1 Diving Pool (Diving)
 Xinzhuang Baseball Stadium (Baseball)
 Yingfeng Riverside Park Roller Sports Rink (A) (Roller Sports)

Venue changes
In June 2015, Taipei's Mayor Ko Wen-je announced that organizers had shifted the opening and closing ceremonies from the Taipei Dome to the Taipei Municipal Stadium due to delays in the construction of the domed stadium.

Marketing

Motto
The official motto of the games was For You, For Youth. It was adopted to represent the assembly of university athletes from around the world to compete and pursue for dreams and victory.

Logo
The logo of the games was a stylized image of the Chinese character Běi (北) as in the host city, Taipei (臺北 Táiběi). The logo was based on the shape of letter U, which stands for Universiade, United and University. It was adopted to represent the passion, vitality, hope and positivity. The logo's combination of five colors (blue, yellow, black, green and red) represents the assembly of university athletes from around the world to compete. The logo was designed by Yu Ming-lung.

Mascot
	

The mascot of the games was Bravo the Bear, a Formosan black bear. The white V on the chest of the Formosan black bear and the gold medal represented the hope of the games athletes in pursuing dreams and victory, while the identity of the black bear as the endangered species in Taiwan represented commitment to protecting the natural environment. The mascot name, Bravo, which is an expression of approval in Italian, was chosen to represent athletes' bravery in achieving outstanding results. The Mandarin name of the mascot, Xióng Zàn, sounds like the word "brilliant" in the Taiwanese Min-nan language. The mascot was designed by Yu Ming-lung.

Theme song
The official theme song of the Taipei 2017 Universiade was "Embrace the World with You", composed by Kris Wu and sung by I-WANT STAR POWER. The theme song was produced by techno producer Howie B and Taiwanese music producer Ada Su.

Attendees

On 7 July, it was announced that the President of the Republic of China (Taiwan), Tsai Ing-wen would attend the event.

In what has been referred to as a "stealth boycott", China officially announced that it would not be sending teams to participate in team events, but individual Chinese athletes are allowed to travel to Taiwan and compete in the individual events.

Days before the opening ceremony, Ugandan sports official Norman Katende stated that the Ugandan team had been ordered not to travel to Taiwan because of their country's adherence to the "one China" policy. Katende published a letter received from the Ugandan Ministry of Foreign Affairs reading "The purpose of this letter is to inform you of 'the one china policy', which is the position of the government of Uganda. In this regard therefore the Ministry of Foreign Affairs is advising that your Ministry does not send an official delegation to participate." The Taiwanese Ministry of Foreign Affairs representative Eleanor Wang said "The Uganda team is still trying to talk with its government and is hoping to be allowed to attend the games in Taipei." In an update on 15 August, Katende published a statement from Makerere University Sports and Recreation Department head Peninnah Kabenge, citing "overaction and misunderstanding" for the Ministry's actions. Ms. Kabenge later confirmed this, writing "It is official team UGANDA is on the way to the 29th Universiade."

Opening ceremony
A few weeks before the opening ceremony, it was confirmed that audience members would be allowed to bring Taiwan flags into the stadium, though official participants of the opening ceremony on the stadium floor would not be allowed to use them.

The opening ceremony on 19 August was affected by several incidents of protest from protestors outside the stadium, as well as rumors that one or more Islamic State (IS) sympathisers had infiltrated the country, either as foreign workers or as part of the event's guest teams. Several groups and organizations, including opponents to the pension reform that was carried out in June, also staged protests outside of the Taipei Municipal Stadium which in turn caused security concerns that affected the opening ceremony.

Before the event, it was known that athletes from China would not take part in the Parade of Nations for political reasons. However, protests outside the stadium prevented all athletes and flagbearers after Burkina Faso (starting with Burundi) from entering the stadium at the scheduled time. Volunteers carried the flags into the stadium in the designated order, while the athletes waited outside. Shortly after the volunteer carrying Zimbabwe's flag entered the stadium, all of the placard bearers between Burundi and Zimbabwe entered (not in alphabetical order), followed by all of their athletes. The host country's team, the Chinese Taipei delegation, entered last in the proper order (placard bearer, followed by flagbearer, followed by their athletes).

Over 5,600 uniformed and plain-clothes Taiwanese police, including Military police armed with rifles, were present to ensure the smooth running of the opening ceremony.

Closing ceremony
During the closing ceremony, athletes from Argentina, Brazil, Canada, Denmark, Dominican Republic and the United Kingdom thanked Taiwan by carrying banners, Republic of China flags and wigs with the colours of the ROC flag. A day after the Closing Ceremony, Argentinian athletes were given an official warning by FISU for bringing flags of the Republic of China into the stadium as they marched in the parade of nations in the closing ceremony.

The host of 2019 Summer Universiade, Naples, Italy, also gave performances at the closing ceremony.

Sport
Originally, this would be the first edition since the 2003 Summer Universiade in which the number of optional sports would be reduced to 3. However, due to these internal issues an exception was made.The Organizing Committee, at bidding process,opted to add the 14 compulsory sports: archery, badminton and taekwondo.Later,they asked FISU to add two more as the local public was showing low interest and to increase the medal chances: weightlifting and golf.As happened two years before,the local authorities wanted to add another one,the baseball.Two other local federations also required the addition of their sports as they also understood the appeal of their sports in the country:Roller Skating and Wushu, which have recently been recognized as University sports by FISU will be part.The eight:billiards, was added later.

 
 Aquatics
 
 
 
 
 
 
 
 
 
 
 
 
 Artistic gymnastics (14)
 Rhythmic gymnastics (8)

Participants

Schedule

Medal table
The host nation of the  Republic of China (Taiwan) is recognized by the name of  Chinese Taipei by FISU.

See also
 List of sporting events in Taiwan

References

External links
 Universiade Taipei 2017 
 Protesters fight for Linkou park
 Linkou residents protest athletes' village proposal
 2017 Summer Universiade Regulations

 
2017
U
Summer Universiade, 2017
Universiade Summer
Sports competitions in Taipei
Multi-sport events in Taiwan
2010s in Taipei
August 2017 sports events in Asia